Spotswood College is a co-educational state secondary school in Spotswood, New Plymouth, New Zealand. It was founded in 1960 and celebrated its 50th Jubilee in 2010. It was formerly New Zealand's largest school.

It is New Plymouth's only co-educational secondary school, with a current roll of  students. The college has a diverse multi-cultural student body and modern facilities for staff and students.

Some of the less common features of Spotswood College include its beach volleyball arena, horticultural facilities, music department complete with recording facilities, and highly rated special education and international departments. A new gymnasium is currently under construction, and two classroom blocks are planned to be demolished to make way for new learning areas to be constructed.

Houses
Spotswood College initially had four houses. In 1969, when the college expanded the education department split the college into two schools, one named East, the other West. In 1980 the college reverted to its original structure and the four house system was re-introduced. The houses were named after the original settlers of New Plymouth. In 2012, the houses were given dual names with the original names added. The house names are based from the Sugar Loaf Islands off the coast of New Plymouth.

1960–1968 and 2012–present
  Mikotahi
  Moturoa
  Motumahanga
  Paritutu

1969–1979
  East
  West

1980–2012
  Darnell
  Atkinson
  Barrett
  Richmond

International
Spotswood College has hosted international students from Italy, Germany, Brazil, Japan, Italy, USA, China, Russia, New Caledonia, Sweden, Switzerland and Thailand. It has specific facilities and staff members to support them during their time in New Zealand.

In 2009, 22 students from Spotswood College's kapa haka group Te Kura Tuarua O Ngamotu were chosen to represent New Zealand at the tenth annual Te Manahua Maori cultural competition in Laie, Hawaii.

In 2013, Spotswood College provided students learning Japanese the opportunity to visit their sister school Hatsukaichi Senior High School in Hiroshima, Japan. In exchange, 8 students and 1 teacher from Hatsukaichi Senior High School visited Spotswood College and were hosted by local families.

Classes and groups from Spotswood College have also visited Japan, New Caledonia, Argentina, Vietnam, Cambodia, Thailand, United Kingdom, Greece and Italy.

Sister school
  Hatsukaichi Senior High School in Hiroshima, Japan

Paritutu tragedy

On 8 August 2012, Spotswood College students Stephen Kahukaka-Gedye and Felipe Melo, both 17, and their Taranaki Outdoor Pursuits and Education Centre (TOPEC) instructor Bryce Jourdain, 42, were swept out to sea while climbing around Paritutu rock as part of a TOPEC camp activity. The body of Felipe Melo was later found and identified. The bodies of Bryce and Stephen were never found.

TOPEC pleaded guilty to three charges. A fourth was dropped. TOPEC was charged $250,000 for the incident. TOPEC still runs camps and activities for secondary schools around the Taranaki region, however Spotswood College have never held camps with TOPEC since the incident. Spotswood College now has a stone monument in memory of them outside the entrance of the college.

Principals
 Mr Alex L McPhail (1960–1977)
 Mr Evan. E Thomas (1978–1987)
 Mr Barry P Finch (1987–2002)
 Mr Graeme McFadyen (2003–2009)
 Mr. Mark A. Bowden (2010–2018)
Mrs. Nicola Ngarewa (2018–present)

In mid 2018, it was announced that Mr. Mark Bowden would be retiring from his position as Principal at the end of term two. After a selection process, the Board of Trustees selected former Patea Area School Principal Nicola Ngarewa to take over the position at the beginning of term four, and become the school's first female principal. Mr. Daryn Shaw became acting principal for the entirety of term three while Mrs Ngarewa transitioned from Patea Area School.

Notable staff and alumni

Staff
 Link Abrams-American born-basketball player, taught maths.
Mark Bowden — former principal, Member of the New Zealand Order of Merit in the 2021 New Year Honours for services to education
Peter Jefferies — music teacher, musician

Alumni

Liz Craig — current Member of Parliament
Mark Crysell — former TVNZ Europe correspondent and current Sunday reporter
Harry Duynhoven — former Mayor of New Plymouth, Member of Parliament for New Plymouth, and current New Plymouth Councillor
Marianne Muggeridge — painter and screenprinter
Willie Talau — rugby league player

References

Educational institutions established in 1960
Secondary schools in Taranaki
Schools in New Plymouth
1960 establishments in New Zealand